The 1964 Lambeth Council election took place on 7 May 1964 to elect members of Lambeth London Borough Council in London, England. The whole council was up for election and the Labour party gained control of the council. The election is notable for being the first one ever fought by John Major.

Background
These elections were the first to the newly formed borough. Previously elections had taken place in the Metropolitan Borough of Lambeth and Metropolitan Borough of Wandsworth. These boroughs were joined to form the new London Borough of Lambeth by the London Government Act 1963.

A total of 159 candidates stood in the election for the 60 seats being contested across 20 wards. These included a full slate from the Conservative and Labour parties, while the Liberals stood 30 candidates. Other candidates included 6 Communists and 3 Independents. All wards were three-seat wards.

This election had aldermen as well as directly elected councillors.  Labour got 9 aldermen and the Conservatives 1.

The Council was elected in 1964 as a "shadow authority" but did not start operations until 1 April 1965.

Election result
The results saw Labour gain the new council with a majority of 24 after winning 42 of the 60 seats. Overall turnout in the election was 26.1%. This turnout included 832 postal votes.

|}

Ward results

Angell

Bishop's

Clapham Park

Clapham Town

Ferndale

Herne Hill

Knight's Hill

Larkhall

Leigham

Oval

Prince's

St Leonard's

Stockwell

Streatham South

Streatham Wells

Thornton

Thurlow Park

Town Hall

Tulse Hill

Vassall

References

See also

1964
1964 London Borough council elections
20th century in the London Borough of Lambeth